Subedar Manish Kaushik (born 11 January 1996) is an Indian boxer who completes in the lightweight division. He is employed with Indian Army as a Junior Commissioned Officer (JCO). Kaushik won the gold medal at the Doha International Boxing Tournament, in his first international appearance. Two years later, Manish won gold at the 2017 National Boxing Games. Manish Kaushik later went to represent India in 2018 Commonwealth Games, winning the silver medal. He represented India in the lightweight division in the 2020 Summer Olympics. Manish hails from the village of Devsar in the Bhiwani district of Haryana. Manish Kaushik won abronze in the 63 kg category at World Championships.

Early life and debut in boxing
Manish Kaushik was born on 11 January 1996 in Devsar village, 5 kilometers (3.1 mi) from Bhiwani, Haryana in Hindu family. His father, Somdutt Sharma, is a farmer, while his mother is a homemaker. Kaushik did his primary schooling in Devsar, Haryana and secondary schooling in Bhiwani and finally received a bachelor's degree from Govt. College of Education, Bhiwani. kaushik rose as early as 4 a.m. to balance his training and studies. In order to ensure a better life for their underprivileged family, Kaushik decided to learn boxing. In 2008, boxer Jitender Kumar participated in the 2008 Summer Olympics inspiring Manish Kaushik to pursue boxing. Kaushik succeeded in entering the Indian Army. In 2016 with his boxing credentials, Kaushik, boxing grew from an interest and passion to a career choice. Manish Kaushik became the Indian National Champion after defeating the defending champion Shiva Thapa in 2017.

Career

BOXAM International Boxing Tournament 2021
Won gold medal after defeating Denmark's Boxer

AIBA International Boxing Tournament 2019
Won Bronze Medal

Commonwealth Games 2018
 Won against M Alexander Trinidad and Tobago W 4–0
 Won against C French of England in the quarters, W 5–0
 Won against J McGivern of Northern Ireland in the Semi-final, W 4–1
 Lost 3–2 against Garside of Australia in the final and became silver medalist.

Asian Game Test Event Indonesia 2018
Kaushik won gold medal in his weight category in Asian Game Test Event held in Jakarta Indonesia.

Kazakhstan International Boxing Tournament 2017
In 2017, Kazakhstan International Boxing Tournament held in Kazakhstan, Manish Kaushik wins silver medal in his weight category.

Doha International Boxing Tournament 2015
Kaushik won gold medal in his weight category in Doha International Boxing Tournament held in Doha, Qatar.

References

https://timesofindia.indiatimes.com/sports/boxing/boxer-manish-kaushik-strikes-gold-at-boxam-international/articleshow/81369123.cms

External links
http://www.asbcnews.org/manish-kaushik-defeated-star-shiva-thapa-at-the-indian-national-elite-championships/
https://timesofindia.indiatimes.com/sports/commonwealth-games/2018-commonwealth-games-know-your-cwg-athlete-manoj-kumar/articleshow/63540745.cms
http://www.sportstarlive.com/videos/manish-kaushik-i-was-confident-against-shiva-thapa/article22623605.ece'''

Indian male boxers
1996 births
Living people
People from Bhiwani
Boxers at the 2020 Summer Olympics
Olympic boxers of India
Commonwealth Games medallists in boxing
Commonwealth Games silver medallists for India
Boxers at the 2018 Commonwealth Games
AIBA World Boxing Championships medalists
Lightweight boxers
Recipients of the Arjuna Award
Medallists at the 2018 Commonwealth Games